Albert Edward Caswell (1884–1954), was head of the Department of Physics at the University of Oregon from 1934 to 1949, a Professor Emeritus, and Fellow of the American Physical Society.

Early life and education 
Albert Edward Caswell, son of John J. Caswell and Patience Ethel Smith, was born May 24,1884, in Winnipeg, Manitoba, Canada. He married Mary Constance Edwards on July 3, 1912, in Santa Clara, California. They were parents of four children.

Caswell earned an A.B. in mathematics at Stanford University in 1908, and a Ph.D. in physics at Stanford in 1911. His dissertation, advised by Fernando Sanford, was titled, Determination of Peltier Electromotive Force for Several Metals by Compensation of Methods.

Caswell became a U.S. citizen December 22, 1909.

He was a member of the Central Presbyterian Church of Eugene and a trustee of the Westminster Foundation.

Career 
Caswell's first academic appointment was teaching at Stanford for three years, then teaching at Purdue University from 1911 to 1913. He joined the faculty at the University of Oregon, serving there between 1914 and 1949, and researching the properties of metals. He was a National Research Fellow at Princeton University in 1919–1920. From 1931 to 1933, he was transferred to Oregon State University, "as a result of the unification of the State System of Higher Education". He returned to the University of Oregon and was appointed chair of the Department of Physics in 1934. He was chair until 1949, and he was later named Professor Emeritus.

Caswell authored a widely used textbook in general physics. During World War II Caswell served on staff at the MIT Radiation Laboratory, where he led a section that produced instructional handbooks for prototype radar sets.

He died in Eugene, Oregon, on June 18, 1954.

Selected publications

Books 
 Caswell, A. E. (1928). An outline of physics. Macmillan.
Caswell, A. E. (February 1944) Handbook of Instructions for AN/APA-9 radar set. Complete edition. (MIT Radiation Lab Rept M148C.) 253 p.

Journal articles

Awards, honors 

 July 4, 1919, National Research Fellowship, Princeton University.

 1945, American Physical Society Fellow: A. E. Caswell, University of Oregon

References 

1884 births
20th-century American physicists
Fellows of the American Physical Society
Stanford University alumni
1954 deaths